Italy competed at the 1958 European Athletics Championships in Stockholm, Sweden, from 19 to 24 August 1958.

Medalists

Top eight

Men

Women

See also
 Italy national athletics team

References

External links
 EAA official site

Italy at the European Athletics Championships
Nations at the 1958 European Athletics Championships
1958 in Italian sport